Tasha Williams may refer to:

Tasha Williams, see List_of_The_L_Word_characters#W
Tasha Williams (athlete)

See also
Natasha Williams (disambiguation)